Hemvägen is the first release by Detektivbyrån released on the band's own label Danarkia. The band made the songs "E18", "Nattöppet" and "Dansbanan" available on their website. Nattöppet was used in a holiday-themed Sprint commercial in 2007.

Track listing
 "E18" - 3:29
 "Hemvägen" - 4:03
 "Nattöppet" - 3:20
 "Monster" - 2:49
 "Dansbanan" - 3:49
 "Granmon" - 2:19
 "Vänerhavet" - 4:06

References 

2006 EPs
EPs by Swedish artists
Detektivbyrån albums